William Milligan Sloane III (August 15, 1906 – September 25, 1974) was an American writer of fantasy and science fiction literature, and a publisher. Sloane is known best for his novel To Walk the Night.

From 1955 until his death in New City, New York, Sloane was the director of the Rutgers University Press in New Jersey. Before then, he had spent more than 25 years working for several other publishers. He formed his own publishing company, William Sloane Associates, in 1946. William Sloane Associates was sold to William Morrow and Company in 1952.

Early life
Sloane was born in Plymouth, Massachusetts, attended The Hill School and graduated from Princeton University in 1929.

Personal life
Sloane married Julia Margaret Hawkins in 1929. They had three children:  William Curtis Sloane (born 1932), Jessie Miranda Sloane (born 1935), and Julie Ann Sloane (born 1945).

Critical reception
Groff Conklin described To Walk The Night as "a subtle, moving story of mood and character, written in the great tradition of British fantasy, even though the author is an American." Anthony Boucher praised the same novel for its "rich warm character-drawing, disturbing subtlety, [and] splendid sense of vast beauty in the midst of terror." P. Schuyler Miller ranked it as "one of the great classics of modern science fiction." Hartford Courant reviewer George W. Earley praised it as "a wondrous blending of science and occultism guaranteed to unnerve the most blasé of readers."

Author Robert Bloch included To Walk the Night on his list of favourite horror novels.

To Walk the Night and the Edge of Running Water were published together as The Rim of Morning in 1964, and reissued during 2015 with an introduction by Stephen King. King wrote, "They are good stories and can be read simply for pleasure, but what makes them fascinating and takes them to a higher level is their complete (and rather blithe) disregard of genre boundaries."

Works 
 Back Home (1931), a ghost play in one act
 Runner in the Snow (1931), a play of the supernatural in one act
 Crystal Clear (1932), a fantasy play
 Ballots for Bill (1933), co-authored by William Ellis Jones
 The Silence of God (1933), a play for Christmas in one act
 Art for Art's Sake (1934)
 The Invisible Clue (1934), written under the name William Milligan
 Gold Stars for Glory (1935)
 To Walk the Night (1937), a science fiction novel with horror elements
 The Edge of Running Water (1939), a science fiction novel with horror elements; adapted as the motion picture The Devil Commands
 Space, Space, Space: Stories About the Time When Men Will Be Adventuring to the Stars (1953), a collection edited by Sloane
 Stories for Tomorrow: An Anthology of Modern Science Fiction (1954), a collection edited by Sloane 
 The Craft of Writing (1979), edited by Julia H. Sloane

References

Further reading
 American Authors and Books: 1640 to the Present Day. 3rd revised edition. By W. J. Burke and Will D. Howe. Revised by Irving Weiss and Anne Weiss. New York: Crown Publishers, 1972.
 Contemporary Authors. Volumes 53-56. Detroit: Gale Research, 1975.
 Who Was Who in America. Volume 6, 1974-1976. Chicago: Marquis Who's Who, 1976.
 Twentieth-Century Science-Fiction Writers. 3d edition. Edited by Noelle Watson and Paul E. Schellinger. Chicago: St. James Press, 1991.
 The Encyclopedia of Science Fiction. Edited by John Clute and Peter Nicholls. New York: St. Martin's Press, 1993.
 St. James Guide to Science Fiction Writers. 4th edition. Edited by Jay P. Pederson. Detroit: St. James Press, 1996.
 Howard, John. "A Look at The Edge of Running Water by William Sloane." All Hallows 29 (2002).

External links
 William M. Sloane papers, 1931–1979: Finding Aid, Princeton University Library Manuscripts Division, 2002.

1906 births
1974 deaths
20th-century American businesspeople
20th-century American male writers
20th-century American novelists
American fantasy writers
American male novelists
American publishers (people)
American science fiction writers
The Hill School alumni
Princeton University alumni